PORS stands for Plus One Recall Store. It is a problem used in evolutionary computation and genetic programming.

The PORS language consists of two terminal nodes (1 and recall), one unary operation (store) and one binary operation (plus) that together make up a parse tree that calculates a number.

References

Evolutionary computation